Ahlowal is a town in the province of Punjab, Pakistan, 80 km from Lahore.

Its district is Kasur and its tehsil is Pattoki. It is 2 km from Changa Manga.

The people of Ahlowal are aware of many languages including english, urdu, arabic, persian and punjabi.

Their native language is punjabi. The native occupation of the inhabitants is to cultivate crops  of lot of types including sugar cane, tobacco, Turmeric, corn, cotton etc. Ahlowal has a special background in cultivating potato. Ahlowal is rich in the latest technology like 4G internet technology, electricity, telephonic system and schools. The new generation has shown keen interest towards latest technology and higher studies. It has produces many Professors, Engineers, Doctors, Philosophers in private and Govt. organizations. It has also produced a first gold medalist in M.Sc Physics (University of Engineering & Technology, Lahore).

Populated places in Kasur District
Union councils of Kasur District